The Dorpskerk (town church) also known as the Maartenskerk in Ouddorp (South Holland, Netherlands) was completed in 1348 and is situated in the town's centre. The tower was completed in the early 16th-century. The church was completely renovated in the 18th-century. The church and tower are rijksmonuments, listed as number 16267 and 16268.

The 1,160 seat church is still in use by the Restored Reformed Church. Originally it was a Roman Catholic church. During the Reformation it became a Protestant church. In 2010, the church was transferred from the Dutch Reformed Church to the Restored Reformed Church.

References

External links
 The church on the website of the Rijksdienst voor het Cultureel Erfgoed.
 The tower on the website of the Rijksdienst voor het Cultureel Erfgoed.

14th-century churches in the Netherlands
Religious buildings and structures completed in 1348
Churches in South Holland
Goeree-Overflakkee
Reformed church buildings in the Netherlands
Rijksmonuments in South Holland
Protestant churches converted from Roman Catholicism